Sir Horace Christian Dawkins  (25 December 1867–4 February 1944) was a British civil servant who served as a clerk in the Parliament of the United Kingdom. 

He was educated at Eton College and Balliol College, Oxford. During the First World War he served as a Divisional Commander in the Metropolitan Special Constabulary, and was made a Member of the Order of the British Empire on 7 January 1918.

Dawkins was appointed a Companion of the Order of the Bath in the 1925 Birthday Honours while a Clerk Assistant. Between 1930 and 1937 he served as Clerk of the House of Commons, and he was appointed a Knight Commander of the Order of the Bath on 31 October 1925.

References

1867 births
1944 deaths
Alumni of Balliol College, Oxford
British civil servants
Clerks of the House of Commons
Knights Commander of the Order of the Bath
Members of the Order of the British Empire
People educated at Eton College